The Presidential Management Fellows (PMF) Program is a two-year training and leadership development program at a United States government agency, administered by the U.S. Office of Personnel Management (OPM), for advanced degree holders (both current and recent graduates). After completing the program, agencies may convert PMFs to permanent federal civilian employees.

Program history 
The PMF Program was established by Executive Order in 1977, and amended by Executive Order in 2003 to attract to the Federal service outstanding citizen-scholars from a variety of academic disciplines and career paths who have a clear interest in, and commitment to, excellence in the leadership and management of public policies and programs. Program regulations were amended again in December 2010 by Executive Order establishing the PMF Program as one of the three student Pathways to federal employment. By drawing graduate students from diverse social and cultural backgrounds, the PMF Program provides a continuing source of trained men and women to meet the future challenges of public service.  The PMF program was formerly referred to as the Presidential Management Internship (PMI) program. In September 2013, OPM added a new STEM track to the PMF process to increase opportunities for science and technology students and meet the demand for qualified candidates for these roles in government, but this track was later removed.

Eligibility 

There are two situations where graduate students may be eligible to apply to the PMF program. Graduate students from all academic disciplines who expect to complete an advanced degree from a qualifying college or university by August 31 of the academic year in which the competition is held are eligible to become Fellows. Alternatively, those who have completed an advanced degree (masters or professional) from a qualifying college or university during the previous 2 years from the opening date of the PMF Program's application announcement are eligible. Individuals who previously applied for the program, but were not selected as a Finalist, may reapply if they meet eligibility requirements. Finalists come from a diverse range of graduate institutions, but the schools with the most PMF Finalists in 2014 included American University, University of Michigan, Harvard University, Georgetown University, George Washington University, Columbia University, and Johns Hopkins University.

The application process requires a résumé, an online assessment, and short essays. Potential fellows should demonstrate breadth and quality of accomplishments, capacity for leadership, exceptional oral and written communication skills, and a commitment to excellence in the leadership and management of public policies and programs. The application occurs usually during the autumn. OPM announces finalists names during winter. Those who are nominated as finalists remain finalists for one year, unless appointed by an agency during that year. Finalists may reapply to the Program before the year of appointment eligibility ends; however, status as a current Finalist is forfeited upon accessing the on-line assessment. The program is extremely competitive: for the PMF Class of 2013, there were 663 finalists (eligible for appointment as Fellows), who were selected from well over 12,000 nominees, an acceptance rate of approximately five percent.

Benefits 

Fellows are hired at the civil service ranks of GS-09, GS-11, or GS-12 (or equivalent pay band, depending on agency) with Excepted Service appointment status at the beginning of the Fellowship. Following satisfactory completion of each year of the Fellowship, Fellows are eligible for promotion to the next GS level (or equivalent pay band, depending on agency) but cannot be promoted higher than GS-13 during the Fellowship. After successful completion of the Fellowship, agencies may noncompetitively appoint Fellows to permanent positions and grant Fellows career or career-conditional status.

Gaining agencies must provide Fellows at least eighty hours of formal classroom training each year of the Fellowship that addresses the core competencies required of the occupation or functional discipline in which Fellows will most likely be placed upon completion of the Fellowship.

The PMF Leadership Development Program (PMF LDP) is a new offering for Fellows, designed to support a PMF's leadership journey during their two-year fellowship. Participation in the PMF LDP counts towards their training and developmental requirements. Participation is at the agency’s discretion and at the discretion of the Fellow’s supervisor and agency.

Gaining agencies must allow Fellows at least one developmental assignment ("rotation") of four to six months in duration in any occupation at any U.S. government agency, pending gaining agency approval. It is not uncommon for gaining agencies to prohibit Fellows from completing rotations outside gaining agencies.

PMFs are individually assigned a personal mentor during the Fellowship. Mentors must be senior leaders and ideally from outside a Fellow's chain of command. Mentors assist Fellows with completing the requisite Individual Development Plan, identifying valuable developmental assignments, providing career advice, being a confidential sounding board, and act as advocates for Fellows.

As employees of the U.S. government, PMFs earn annual leave, sick leave, and paid Federal holidays. PMFs are enrolled in the Federal Employees Retirement System (FERS). Upon appointment, PMFs may elect life insurance, health insurance, and Thrift Savings Plan options.

U.S. government agencies are authorized to repay student loans under the Federal Student Loan Repayment Program, as provided by Part 537 of Title 5, Code of Federal Regulations. The amount repaid by an agency is subject to limits of $10,000 per employee per calendar year and a total of $60,000 per employee. Student loan repayment varies widely by agency.

Alumni

Presidential Management Alumni Association (PMAA) 
The Presidential Management Alumni Association (PMAA) is a 501(c)(3) nonprofit organization created to improve, expand, and promote the alumni community as well as the PMF Program. They are dedicated to supporting alumni excellence and achievement, advocating for the PMF program, and holding up public service as a noble and necessary profession.

PMAG 
The non-profit Presidential Management Alumni Group (PMAG) was formerly the primary alumni group for PMIs and PMFs. It was organized in 1981 to advance the professionalism of public service and augment the education and career development of those who have served in or assisted the PMF Program. PMAG was not sponsored by OPM. The members were Fellows, alumni, and other individuals interested in recruitment and development of Federal Government career managers. PMAG sponsored professional and social activities, maintained a network among alumni, and provided support to maintain the PMF Program as the Federal Government’s premier mechanism for recruiting future managers.

Notable alumni 
 Craig B. Allen – United States Ambassador to Brunei 
Kenneth S. Apfel – 13th United States Commissioner of Social Security
Jeff Merkley – U.S. Senator from Oregon
Andy Kim – Member of the U.S. House of Representatives from New Jersey's 3rd District
Roberta S. Jacobson – Former U.S. Assistant Secretary of State for Western Hemisphere Affairs and U.S. Ambassador to Mexico
 Matthew Auer – Public Policy scholar, currently serving as Dean of University of Georgia School of Public and International Affairs
 Mitch Bainwol – CEO of the Alliance of Automobile Manufacturers, former CEO of the Recording Industry Association of America
 Robert G. Berschinski – Deputy Assistant Secretary of State during Obama Administration
 Richard Boly – American diplomat and Director of the Office of eDiplomacy at US Department of State
 Grace Crunican – transit policymaker currently overseeing Bay Area Rapid Transit; former Deputy Administrator at the Federal Transit Administration during the Clinton Administration
 Mike Dovilla – former member of the Ohio House of Representatives
 Michael J. Fitzpatrick - American Diplomat
 Barbara Favola – State Senator for Senate of Virginia
 Kyle Foggo – former Executive Director of the Central Intelligence Agency
 Alan Friedman – American journalist covering finance and foreign affairs
 Colleen Hartman – Deputy Director at NASA for the Goddard Space Flight Center, Professor at Elliott School of International Affairs at George Washington University
 Brendan Kyle Hatcher – American diplomat
 Kathleen Hicks – Deputy Secretary of Defense
 Baxter Hunt – American diplomat and son of North Carolina governor James Baxter Hunt, Jr.
 Derek Kan – Executive Associate Director of the Office of Management and Budget former General Manager at Lyft, member of Amtrak Board of Directors (appointed by Barack Obama)
 Betsy Markey – former U.S. Representative for Colorado's 4th congressional district
 David Norquist – current Deputy Secretary of Defense in the United States Department of Defense
 Sean O'Keefe – Chairman and CEO of aerospace giant Airbus Group, Inc., former Chancellor of Louisiana State University, Administrator of NASA from 2001–2004, Secretary of the Navy from 1992-1993
 Natalie Quillian – White House deputy chief of staff (2023-present), White House deputy Coronavirus response coordinator (2021-2022)
 Nicholas Rasmussen – Director of the National Counterterrorism Center
 Anne C. Richard – Assistant Secretary of State for Population, Refugees, and Migration at the United States Department of State
 Suzanne Rivera – President of Macalester College
 Alvin Salehi – Senior Technology Advisor at The White House and Co-Founder of Code.gov
 Dan Seals (politician) – business consultant and a Democratic political candidate from Illinois
 Deena Shakir - venture capitalist at Lux Capital
 Dan Tangherlini – Administrator of General Services Administration in the Barack Obama Administration
 Alan B. Thomas, Jr. – Commissioner, Federal Acquisition Service
 Will Tiao – actor and television writer
 Kierston Todt – Cybersecurity scholar and policymaker
 Damon Wilson – executive vice president at the Atlantic Council and formerly the Senior Director for European Affairs at the U.S. National Security Council
Nancy Potok – former Chief Statistician of the United States
Bonnie Jenkins – Under Secretary of State for Arms Control and International Security Affairs, Former U.S. Ambassador at the U.S. Department of State, serving as Coordinator for Threat Reduction Programs in the Bureau of International Security and Nonproliferation
Shalanda Young – Director of the Office of Management and Budget
Nani Coloretti – Deputy Director of the Office of Management and Budget

References

External links 
 Official Presidential Management Fellows site
PMF Subscriber Lists (to stay informed on the PMF Program)
PMF Apply Site (where individuals apply during the annual application period)
Presidential Management Alumni Association site
 Presidential Management Alumni Group site
 PathtoPMF – Unofficial "Guide to PMF process" plus discussion board on PMF
 PMF Fellow – Unofficial discussion board and resource on PMF

Executive branch of the government of the United States
United States Office of Personnel Management
Fellowships
Internship programs
1977 establishments in the United States